Bowen Consolidated Colliery is a heritage-listed former mine at Station Street and Second Avenue, Scottville, Whitsunday Region, Queensland, Australia. It was established in 1919. It is also known as No. 1 Underground Mine and Bowen Consolidated Coal Company Colliery. It was added to the Queensland Heritage Register on 3 December 2009.

History 
The Bowen Consolidated Colliery (established in 1919) is a former underground mine at Scottville near Collinsville in North Queensland. The No. 1 Underground Mine at the Bowen Consolidated Colliery continued production until the end of 1962 by which time it had been superseded by the nearby fully mechanised No. 2 Underground Mine. The colliery is one of the earliest and most intact former coal mines in the Bowen Basin.

It contains about 70% of Queensland's coal. These are deposits of the Permian age and are the most important commercial deposits in the State, producing almost 100% of the State's coking coal and 60% of its thermal coal. In 2006-7, the State's top ten collieries for production were located in the Bowen Basin.

Commercial exploitation of Bowen Basin coal began at Blair Athol in the 1890s. At the time, the main coal producing area was the West Moreton coalfields. Some coal was also produced at the Burrum coalfields and on the Darling Downs. These mines supplied mostly thermal (steaming) coal to a domestic market; the Railway Department was a major customer. The success of mines depended on whether the coal was suitable for firing boilers and on their proximity to a railway line. Most early mines in the Bowen Basin struggled to remain commercially viable.

Intensive exploration of the Bowen Basin coalfield began only after the crisis in the base metals industry due to falling prices from 1907. Tests on the Bowen River Coal Company's lease in 1912 and 1913 sparked a rush to the field. Five syndicates had registered 17 leases straddling the Bowen outcrops by the end of 1915. However, the election of Queensland's first stable Labor government led in August 1915 to Cabinet refusing the private applications and reserving the 6.4 square kilometre area involved for State operations.

Competition for leases subsided into a long wait for railway construction to be completed. At the same time, by the end of 1919, a further nineteen leases had been forfeited to the State for non-payment of rent, and the surviving syndicates had amalgamated to form the Bowen Consolidated Coal Mining Company.

When the shares in the Company were released onto the market they failed to attract as much interest as had been anticipated, likely due to the rail link being some years away. So the Company only committed to a drilling programme at the time of the share release. However, by the end of 1919 John McNaughton was appointed manager and work began in earnest. A site for the mine was chosen and two parallel tunnels driven into the Garrick Seam. This activity generated cash which enabled a shaft to be sunk into the Bowen Seam in 1920.

They were secured with a masonry collar and mounted with heavy headframe timbers set on the surface. A dam extending  was constructed for the mine water supply. A gantry and a permanent staging for landing skips were completed. By the end of 1921 a boiler, steam winch and saw bench with steam engine, buildings and explosives magazine were constructed.

By the time the railway connection was finished in 1923, 26 miners and a similar number of surface men were at work at the Bowen Consolidated Coal Mine and output was averaging  of coal per day. Twin tramways were laid down the tunnels and serviced by a stationary steam hauling engine, a compressed air water pump was installed at the foot of the tunnel and the ventilation was improved by sinking a vertical shaft to an extension of one of the cross-cuts and equipping it with a double-inlet sirocco-type fan. Screens were installed on the loading gantry and the Cornish boilers supplied steam to the whole mine.

The steel headframe,  in height and with twin pulleys  in diameter, was purchased second-hand in Charters Towers as was the horizontal twin-cylinder winding engine built by Walkers Limited of Maryborough.

Extant examples of this type of headframe are now uncommon. This type of headframe, where the weight is evenly balanced on all four legs is an old pattern that was superseded by the American A-frame construction in the interwar period. Only two other examples of this type of headframe are known to exist. These are at the Vulcan tin mine in the Mareeba mining district and the Dobbyn copper mine in the Mount Isa mining district. Both are three tier headframes; the headframe at the Bowen Consolidated Mine has four tiers.

By 1926, when production in the tunnels of the Garrick seam was halted by a fault, a ventilation shaft had been completed to the Bowen seam, and a brace had been constructed and connected to the loading gantry ready for switching to the better coal.

Bowen Consolidated Coal Mines Limited developed its own township  from Collinsville and the State Colliery and named it Scotsdale as a tribute to two of the directors of the old Bowen Coal and Coke Company Limited, Adam Hall Scott and John Dinsdale, but the name was changed to Scottville after objections from the postal department. Scottville grew at a slower pace than Collinsville because the mine which supported it was smaller and lacked government funding. Most of the dwellings were constructed from galvanised iron with the manager's house being the only substantial structure for many years. Only 17 miners' homestead perpetual leases had been taken up by the end of 1925 despite the fact that the population was approaching 300. The nearby town of Collinsville at this time had a population of around 800 and comprised a school, shops, police station, hotel, picture theatre, dance hall, bowling green and the early construction of a hospital.

In 1927 Bowen Consolidated Colliery employed 54 men and had seven horses working with the underground teams. By this time the underground section of the mine had electric lighting as did all surface buildings and a new Ingersoll Rand Compressor, to work the dip pump and the jack hammer machines, had been purchased to replace the old second-hand one.

A battery of new Babcock and Wilcox boilers was installed at Bowen Consolidated Colliery in 1929. The coal was railed to Bowen and after 1930 turned into coke for use in the Mount Isa Mine copper smelters. In 1930, a steam winch with coupled cylinders was in process of being installed underground for main and tail haulage. At this time both Scottville and Collinsville (servicing the State Coal Mine a few kilometres away) were "thriving centres of population".

Through the 1930s and 1940s the mine continued to be productive and by 1943 the entire output from the mine was being supplied to the railways. In 1946 two additional Babcock & Wilcox boilers were installed with a shed erected over them. The 1947 Bowen Harbour Board Annual Report noted that an "electric generating set" was installed during that year; this may have been the extant power house.

By 1956 Bowen Consolidated Coal Mines Ltd was a subsidiary of Mount Isa Mines Ltd (MIM). Plans were made to sink a new shaft at the mine in order to meet expansion demands. Aerial photography was to be used to accurately map the area.

In 1962, Bowen Consolidated Coal Mines made a new entry into the Bowen seam which would be known as Bowen Consolidated Coal No. 2 Mine. Production in the fully mechanised No. 2 mine commenced in September of that year (Bowen Independent 1962). The No. 1 Underground Mine at Bowen Consolidated Colliery continued production until late 1962.

By this time, commercial exploitation of coking coal in the Bowen Basin for the export market was commencing on a massive scale to supply the booming Japanese steel industry. International consortiums and mining companies introduced open cut mining methods using huge mining plant including some of the biggest draglines in the world. This revolutionised mining techniques in Queensland; small scale underground mines were largely superseded and the nature of coal mining in Queensland was completely transformed.

By 1980 MIM's subsidiary, Collinsville Coal Company had absorbed Bowen Consolidated Coal Mines Ltd. Part of the disused complex was fenced off by the 1980s.

The former colliery is probably the most intact of its era and type in Queensland. It is one of only two relatively intact former mines known to be extant from the first phase of coalmining in the Bowen Basin. The other is the former Dawson Valley Colliery. The Bowen colliery is recognised in the industry for its historical importance and by an industry expert, Professor Ray Whitmore, as containing "the finest relics of coal mining in the 1920s anywhere in Queensland".

Description 
The major structures include the headframe and gantry, Number One shaft winding house, boiler house, Number Two shaft fan house, powerhouse, bathhouse, mine office, workshop, Garrick Shaft Fan House, sawmill, detonator magazine, lamp shed, water tanks, and single men's quarters. Remains of railway and tramline formations still remain. The remains of other structures include the workshop and stores site, Number Two shaft winding engine, lime store, cement shed, ramps, early bathhouse and fitting shop. Part of the site is surrounded by a recent wire security fence including the headframe, Number One winding house, boiler house and power house. Much of the site is overgrown with grasses, trees and other vegetation.

Headframe and Gantry 
The tapered steel-framed, four-legged headframe is the tallest structure on the site, sitting on foundations about  square in plan. The legs each comprise steel tubing formed from four, quarter cylinder sections rivetted together. The legs are connected with four levels of horizontal steel I-beams with diagonal cross bracing of rods at each level. The assembly of bracing and cross members is rivetted together. A timber platform at the top level is surrounded by a steel railing.

The remains of the lift structure are extant within the headframe. It has the appearance of an open, narrow timber-framed tower rising to the third tier of the headframe at the top of which is a timber platform surrounded by a steel railing. On at least three levels, small timber platforms with steel railings project from the side. All platforms are connected by timber ladders with an additional ladder connecting the top of the lift structure with the top of the headframe itself.

At the lowest tier, and contained within the legs of the headframe, a structure with a corrugated iron gabled roof is located on the timber platform. This structure has open sides except for a small section of wall enclosed with corrugated iron.

Extending to the north from the side of the headframe at the level of the first tier is the partially collapsed gantry. This is an open sided timber structure with a timber deck on top and some extra decking at mid height. The structure contains the remains of a weighbridge and associated weighbridge office. It also contains the remains of at least one coal chute.

A Ruston Hornsby Grantham England two-cylinder steam winding engine is situated immediately adjacent to the west of the headframe. It is mounted on a concrete slab and has two exposed gear wheels and two cable drums with steel cable extant on the larger drum.

Number One Shaft Winding House 
It is a high-set, timber-framed structure with corrugated iron walls and a corrugated iron gabled roof. A curved ridge vent runs the length of the roof. The walls extend to the ground, enclosing the under floor area. There are openings where some sheets of iron are missing from the walls.

The entrance to the building is via the north-east elevation facing the headframe. A timber stair running along the side of the building leads to a landing and the door opening. To the right of the door is a large opening through which can be seen two large cable drums with extant steel cable. The plant located within the winding house includes a two-cylinder steam winding engine (Walkers Limited No. 847 1903).

Boiler House 

These consist of two sets of Babcock and Wilcox water tube boilers and chain grate stokers (a set of two and a set of four). Riveted, steel steam drums are seated on the tops of the enclosures. They are held in place at intervals along the structure by steel girders that run up the sides and across the top. Large square, steel-framed openings at one end of the enclosure expose the ends of the sets of water tubes that run the length of the interior of the structure. A set of tubes is missing from the larger set of boilers, leaving a cavity. Underneath these openings are the arched brick openings of the furnaces.

These comprise the remains of a coal bin, (north) and the condensers and brick flue associated with the boilers (south).

Number Two Shaft and Fan House 
The fan house, immediately south of the remains of the shaft, is a multi-compartment structure.

The eastern part of the structure is constructed of concrete blocks and has a gable roof with a timber frame and corrugated iron cladding. One end is open and the other has a large square opening. Two windows along the eastern side have timber frames and are covered with corrugated iron. There is a single, similar window on the western side. There is no ceiling in this part of the structure.

The rest of the fan house adjoins the western side of the gable-roofed building. This is a flat-roofed structure made of red and brown bricks. A single door opens into a small porch that projects from the front.

Power House 
Two skillion-roofed sections are attached to part of its northern and southern elevations. A steel flue projects from the roof. The plant inside the power house includes two British Thompson Houston Rugby generators, and three Bellis and Morcom diesel engines.

Bathhouses 
It is a lowset, rendered cavity brick structure with a corrugated iron gabled roof and small, high level, rectangular windows. Entrance is gained via a double timber door opening in the middle of the northern elevation.

The interior has a concrete floor, white rendered walls and no ceiling. It contains a large common changing room and common shower area. The entrance opens into the changing area. An open drain runs along the centre of the floor in the shower area; there are no cubicles.

A small corrugated iron bathhouse is situated adjacent to the north of the boiler house.

Lamp shed 
It is a small, timber-framed building, about  square in plan, with a gabled roof. The walls are clad with ripple iron sheeting and the roof and gables are clad with corrugated iron sheeting. There are timber-framed window openings and a single timber door.

Mine Manager's Residence and Office 
It is a single storey timber house, about  square in plan, raised on short stumps with a hipped roof clad in corrugated iron sheeting. The space between the stumps is in-filled with timber battens.

The main entrance is via the north-western elevation. A stair, running parallel to the elevation, rises to a timber landing covered by a corrugated iron skillion roof. A single timber door opens to the interior from the landing. The elevation consists of a front verandah that has been enclosed with sheeting. Two windows to the left of the entrance are aluminium-framed sliding windows; on the right, there are eight sets of louvres. The window hoods consist of flat metal sheeting.

The south-western elevation is clad with corrugated iron except for sections at the front and rear that are clad with flat sheeting. There are sets of louvres towards the front of the elevation and a timber- framed sash window at about the midpoint. Two sets of louvres at the very front are covered with sheeting.

Workshop and Stores 

Three corrugated iron, sliding doors, the largest in the centre, provide access through the front of the shed. There is a large square window opening above the central door and windows to the left of it, shaded by a flat metal hood. A series of steel-framed windows along the sides are each divided into 12 panels.

Adjacent to the west of the workshop are the remains of a number of structures including blacksmith's shop, carpenter's shop, points shed, brattice shed, store, a timber rack and an iron rack.

Garrick Shaft Fan House 
It is a partly demolished brick structure with a flat concrete roof. Two courses of projecting bricks surround the tower a short distance from the top.

Sawmill 
It is an open timber-framed structure with a corrugated iron roof. Evidence of a tramline running from the sawmill directly towards the headframe is still visible. A small section of tramline and tram trolley remains inside the sawmill.

Railway and Tramway 
Railway siding formation still exists although the tracks have been removed. The siding runs in a generally east–west direction across the site, both under and adjacent to the gantry. The remains of a separate network of tramlines through the site also remain although the track, itself, has been removed. The tramline remains connect the Number One shaft under the headframe with the workshops and stores site, boiler house, and sawmill.

Additional structures and evidence 

Other remains on site include the entrances to the Number One and Number Two Garrick tunnels and adjacent office, the Number Two shaft winding engine mount, water tanks, lime store, cement shed, machine and coal loading ramps, boiler ash dump, brickworks and drain. Other artefacts remain in surface and subsurface deposits across the entire site.

Heritage listing 
Bowen Consolidated Colliery was listed on the Queensland Heritage Register on 3 December 2009 having satisfied the following criteria.

The place is important in demonstrating the evolution or pattern of Queensland's history.

As one of Queensland's most intact former coal mines of its type and era, Bowen Consolidated Colliery (1919) is important in demonstrating the evolution of Queensland's coal mining history. As one of the first successful mines in the Bowen Basin, it provides important evidence of the beginning of commercial coal mining in the State's largest and most productive coal field.

The mine is also important in demonstrating the development of coal mining techniques in Queensland. It is typical, in scale and type, of mines prior to the late 1950s. Underground mines like the Bowen Consolidated Colliery became less common during the 1960s following the introduction of large-scale open cut methods.

The place demonstrates rare, uncommon or endangered aspects of Queensland's cultural heritage.

The Bowen Consolidated Colliery is one of only two relatively intact former mines known to be extant from the first phase of coalmining in the Bowen Basin. The other is the former Dawson Valley Colliery. The Bowen colliery is uncommon for its relatively high level of intactness and as a collection of 1920s coal mining technology.

The headframe at the Bowen Consolidated Colliery is important as an uncommon example of its type. This type of headframe, where the weight is evenly balanced on all four legs is an old pattern that was superseded by the American A-frame construction in the interwar period.

The place has potential to yield information that will contribute to an understanding of Queensland's history.

The Bowen Consolidated Colliery has the potential to reveal information through archaeological techniques on important aspects of Queensland's history, including early underground coal mining, the evolving technology in the coal mining industry in Queensland, the working conditions of the mine workers, and the organisation of labour.

The Colliery complex has the potential to answer a range of other archaeological research questions including but not limited to the creation, selection, use and rejection of coal mining technologies, the ethnic and industrial background of mine workers and its influence on operations and organisation, and the impact of technologies and industries on the environment.

The place is important in demonstrating the principal characteristics of a particular class of cultural places.

Bowen Consolidated Colliery is important in demonstrating the principal characteristics of an early 20th century colliery. Most of the above ground structures associated with the mine remain extant and many are highly intact. Extant structures include: headframe and gantry, winding house and plant, boilers, fan houses, power house and plant, bathhouse, mine manager's residence and office, workshop, sawmill and other ancillary structures.

References

Attribution

External links

Queensland Heritage Register
Collinsville, Queensland
Articles incorporating text from the Queensland Heritage Register
Underground mines in Australia
1919 establishments in Australia
Coal mines in Queensland